The IEEE International Electron Devices Meeting (IEDM) is an annual micro- and nanoelectronics conference held each December that serves as a forum for reporting technological breakthroughs in the areas of semiconductor and related device technologies, design, manufacturing, physics, modeling and circuit-device interaction.

The IEEE IEDM is where "Moore’s Law" got its name, as Gordon Moore first published his predictions in an article in Electronics Magazine in 1965.  Ten years later he refined them in a talk at the IEDM, and from that point on people began referring to them as Moore's Law. Moore’s Law states that the complexity of integrated circuits would double approximately every two years.

IEDM brings together managers, engineers, and scientists from industry, academia, and government around the world to discuss nanometer-scale CMOS transistor technology, advanced memory, displays, sensors, MEMS devices, novel quantum and nanoscale devices using emerging phenomena, optoelectronics, power, energy harvesting, and ultra-high-speed devices, as well as process technology and device modeling and simulation.  The conference also encompasses discussions and presentations on devices in silicon, compound and organic semiconductors, and emerging material systems. In addition to technical paper presentations, IEDM includes multiple plenary presentations, panel sessions, tutorials, short courses, invited talks, exhibits and an entrepreneurship panel session conducted by experts in the field from around the globe.

The 68th annual IEEE IEDM was held at the Hilton San Francisco Union Square hotel from December 3–7, 2022. The theme for 2022 was “The 75th Anniversary of the Transistor, and the Next Transformative Devices to Address Global Challenges.”  Among the program highlights were three Plenary talks:
 Celebrating 75 Years of Transistor Innovation by Looking Ahead to the Next Set of Industry Grand Challenges, by Anne Kelleher, Executive VP/General Manager of Technology Development, Intel
 Expanding Human Potential through Imaging and Sensing Technologies, by Yusuke Oike, General Manager, Sony Semiconductor Solutions
 Enabling Full Fault-Tolerant Quantum Computing with Silicon-Based VLSI Technologies, by Maud Vinet, Quantum Hardware Program Manager, CEA-Leti

Sponsor 

The IEEE International Electron Devices Meeting is sponsored by the Electron Devices Society of the Institute of Electrical and Electronics Engineers (IEEE).

History 

The First Annual Technical Meeting on Electron Devices (renamed the International Electron Devices Meeting in the mid-1960s) took place on October 24–25, 1955 at the Shoreham Hotel in Washington D.C. with approximately 700 scientists and engineers in attendance.  At that time, the seven-year-old transistor and the electron tube reigned as the predominant electron-device technology.  Fifty-four papers were presented on the then state-of-the-art in electron device technology, the majority of them from four U.S. companies -- Bell Telephone Laboratories, RCA Corporation, Hughes Aircraft Co. and Sylvania Electric Products.  The need for an electron devices meeting was driven by two factors: commercial opportunities in the fast-growing new "solid-state" branch of electronics, and the U.S. government's desire for solid-state components and better microwave tubes for aerospace and defense.

IEDM 2021 
The 67th annual IEEE International Electron Devices Meeting was held December 11–15, 2021 at the Hilton San Francisco Union Square hotel, with on-demand content available afterward. The Plenary talks were: The Smallest Engine Transforming Humanity: The Past, Present, and Future, by Kinam Kim, Vice Chairman & CEO, Head of Samsung Electronics Device Solutions Division, Samsung; Creating the Future: Augmented Reality, the Next Human-Machine Interface, by Michael Abrash, Chief Scientist, Facebook Reality Labs; and Quantum Computing Technology, by Heike Riel, Head of Science & Technology, IBM Research and IBM Fellow.

IEDM 2020 
The 2020 IEEE International Electron Devices Meeting (IEDM) was held virtually from December 12–18, 2020. Highlights included three plenary talks that addressed important issues for semiconductor technology development: Sri Samavedam, senior vice president at imec, discussed ways to continue scaling in logic devices, while Naga Chandrasekaran, senior vice president at Micron Technology, talked about the innovations needed for advanced memory technologies.  Meanwhile, Sungwoo Hwang, President of Samsung’s Advanced Institute of Technology, gave an overview on the coming symbiosis of semiconductors, AI and quantum computing. The technical program was highlighted by talks from Intel Corp. on a 3D stacked nanosheet transistor architecture, and from Taiwan Semiconductor Manufacturing Co., which gave details about its 5 nm CMOS FinFET technology.

IEDM 2019 
The 2019 IEEE International Electron Devices Meeting (IEDM) took place in San Francisco, CA on December 7–11, 2019. Robert Chau, Intel Senior Fellow, gave a Plenary talk in which he discussed how ongoing innovation will help the industry stay on the path of Moore’s Law. In other Plenary talks, Martin van den Brink, President/Chief Technical Officer of ASML N.V., discussed the importance of EUV lithography, and Kazu Ishimaru, Senior Fellow at Kioxia, discussed the future of non-volatile memory. The technical program was highlighted by talks from Taiwan Semiconductor Manufacturing Co. on its forthcoming 5 nm chip manufacturing technology and by Intel on better ways to manufacture 3D chips. The program also featured many papers discussing various ways to use new memory technologies for artificial intelligence (AI) computing and other applications.

IEDM 2018 
The 2018 IEEE-IEDM took place at the Hilton San Francisco Union Square from December 1–5, 2018. Highlights included three plenary talks that addressed key future directions for semiconductor technology and business practices. Jeffery Welser, Vice President of IBM Research-Almaden, spoke about the hardware needed for artificial research (AI), while Eun Seung Jung, President of Samsung's Foundry Business, spoke about the challenges and opportunities facing chip foundries. Professor Gerhard Fettweis of TU Dresden, meanwhile, spoke about new ways to structure research into semiconductors to effectively pursue non-traditional uses such as bendable, flexible electronic systems. The conference also included an evening panel discussion during which a panel of industry experts looked forward for the next 25 years.  The technical program featured many noteworthy papers on a range of topics, such as innovative memories for AI applications; quantum computing; wireless communications; power devices; and many more.

IEDM 2017 
The 2017 IEEE International Devices Meeting took place at the Hilton San Francisco Union Square from December 2–6, 2017. Highlights included Nobel Prize winner Hiroshi Amano speaking on ‘Transformative Electronics’, AMD President & CEO Lisa Su speaking on multi-chip technologies for high-performance computing; and Intel and Globalfoundries detailing their competing new FinFET technology platforms. Also, IBM’s Dan Edelstein gave a retrospective on copper interconnect. Copper interconnect (i.e., the wiring on computer chips) revolutionized the industry 20 years ago.

IEDM 2016 
The 2016 IEEE International Devices Meeting took place at the Hilton San Francisco Union Square from December 3–7, 2016. The 2016 edition of the IEDM emphasized the following topics: advanced transistors, new memory technologies, brain-inspired computing, bioelectronics, and power electronics.

IEDM 2015 
The 2015 International Electron Devices Meeting took place at the Washington Hilton Hotel from December 5–9, 2015. The major topics included ultra-small transistors, advanced memories, low-power devices for mobile & Internet of Things (IoT) applications, alternatives to silicon transistors, and 3D integrated circuit (IC) technology. There were also a broad range of papers addressing some of the fastest-growing specialized areas in micro/nanoelectronics, including silicon photonics, physically flexible circuits, and brain-inspired computing.

References

Additional information 
 IEDM
 IEDM on Facebook
 IEDM on Twitter: @ieee_iedm
 Electron Device Society of the IEEE
 IEEE
 IEEE Xplore Digital Library

Related conferences 
 Symposia on VLSI Technology and Circuits
 International Solid-State Circuits Conference
 Device Research Conference
 Hot Chips: A Symposium of High Performance Chips

IEEE conferences
Computer science conferences